Puya hofstenii is a species in the genus Puya. This species is native to Bolivia.

References

hofstenii
Flora of Bolivia